Nonsuch Bay may refer to:
 Nonsuch Bay, Antigua and Barbuda
 Nonsuch Bay, Bermuda, Nonsuch Island